Unconditional Love (styled as unconditional L♡VE) is the thirteenth studio album by Japanese singer and songwriter Mai Kuraki. The album was released on October 27, 2021, by Northern Music. It is the follow-up to her 2018 album Let's Goal!: Barairo no Jinsei. The album was released in four versions: standard edition, fan club edition, and two limited editions.

Singles
"Zero kara Hajimete" was released as the lead single from the album on March 6, 2021. The single was re-released as a video single on June 2, 2021. The video single debuted atop on the Oricon Weekly DVD chart and has sold 8,419 copies nationwide. "Can You Feel My Heart" and "Hitori ja Nai" were released as the follow-ups to the single in April and August 2021, respectively.

Track listing

Charts

Daily charts

Daily charts

Weekly charts

Release history

References

2021 albums
Mai Kuraki albums
Being Inc. albums
Japanese-language albums
Albums produced by Daiko Nagato